This is a list of villages in Sliven Province, Bulgaria.

Kotel Municipality

Nova Zagora Municipality

Sliven Municipality

Tvarditsa Municipality
 Bliznets
 Borov Dol
 Biala Palanka
 Zhult Briag
 Orizari
 Sborishte
 Surtsevo
 Chervenakovo
 Shivachevo

See also
List of villages in Bulgaria

 
Sliven